Best Reached Horizons is the first 'Best-Of' album by the Brazilian power metal band Angra, released on October 24, 2012, via SPV/Steamhammer. This compilation marks the 20th Anniversary of the band and the idea behind the name's choice is based on the first demo released by Angra in 1992, entitled Reaching Horizons.

Editions 

European: Double CD - First CD with 10 music from the era in which André Matos was the lead singer, from 1991 until 2000; And second CD with 10 tracks from the era when Edu Falaschi was the vocalist of the band, from 2001 to 2010.
Japanese: CD+DVD - One CD with 18 varied songs from all previous releases; And one DVD with all music videos released by Angra.

Track listing

European edition

Japanese edition

DVD
Carry On (1993)
Time (1993)
Make Believe (1996)
Rebirth (2001)
Pra Frente Brasil! (2002)
Wishing Well (2004)
The Course of Nature (2006)
Lease of Life (2010)

Credits
Band members
Rafael Bittencourt (1991–present) – Lead guitar
Felipe Andreoli (2001–present) - Bass guitar

Former members
André Matos (1991–2000) – Lead vocals, keyboards, piano
Luís Mariutti (1991–2000) - Bass guitar
Aquiles Priester (2001–2008) – Drums, percussion
Edu Falaschi (2001–2010) – Lead vocals, acoustic guitar
Kiko Loureiro (1991–2015) – Lead guitar
Ricardo Confessori (1993–2000/2009–2014) – Drums, percussion

Guest musicians
Alex Holzwarth (1993) – Drums, percussion on Angels Cry
Sabine Edelsbacher (2004) – Lead vocals on "Spread Your Fire" from Temple of Shadows
Fábio Laguna (2001–2008) – Keyboards

Angra (band) compilation albums
2012 compilation albums